Transcriptome-wide association study (TWAS) is a statistical genetics methodology to improve detection power and provide functional annotation for genetic associations with phenotypes by integrating single-nucleotide polymorphism to trait (SNP-trait) associations from genome-wide association studies with SNP-based prediction models of gene expression. The approach was presented by Eric R. Gamazon et al. and Alexander Gusev et al. in the journal Nature Genetics. This methodology has been widely adopted, having received 2057 citations (as of December 24, 2021) according to Google Scholar.

See also 

 Genome-wide association study
 Functional genomics
 Genotype-Tissue Expression (GTEx) project
 Epigenome-wide association study

References

External links 
 GTEx Portal

Statistical genetics